William O'Neill (1929 – 2 January 2015) was an Irish Gaelic footballer and hurler who played in various positions for both the Cork and Galway senior teams.

A dual player at the highest level, he joined the Cork panel in 1951 but later lined out with Galway until his retirement in 1958. He won one All-Ireland football medal, three Connacht football medals and one National Football League medal.

At club level O'Neill played with Carrigtwohill in Cork and an Chéad Cath in Galway.

References

1929 births
2015 deaths
Dual players
Carrigtwohill hurlers
Cork inter-county hurlers
Galway inter-county hurlers
An Chéad Cath Gaelic footballers
Galway inter-county Gaelic footballers
Connacht inter-provincial Gaelic footballers
All-Ireland Senior Hurling Championship winners
Irish Army officers